Ian Frazier (born 1951 in Cleveland, Ohio) is an American writer and humorist. He wrote the 1989 non-fiction history Great Plains, 2010's non-fiction travelogue Travels in Siberia, and works as a writer and humorist for The New Yorker.

Biography
Frazier grew up in Hudson, Ohio. His father, David Frazier, was a chemist, who worked for Sohio; his mother, Peggy, was a teacher, as well as an amateur actor and director, who performed in and directed plays in local Ohio theaters.  He graduated from Western Reserve Academy in 1969 and from Harvard University in 1973.

Writing career

The New York Times critic James Gorman described Frazier's 1996 humor collection Coyote v. Acme (in the title piece, Wile E. Coyote is suing Acme Corporation, the manufacturer of products such as explosives and rocket-propelled devices purchased by the coyote to aid in hunting the Road Runner; these products always backfire disastrously) as the occasion for "irrepressible laughter in the reader." Gorman rates Frazier's first collection, 1986's Dating Your Mom, as "one of the best collections of humor ever published."

Awards 
1989 Whiting Award
1997 Thurber Prize for American Humor, for essay collection Coyote vs. Acme
2009 Thurber Prize for American Humor, for essay collection Lamentations of the Father

Bibliography

References

External links 
 
 
 Ian Frazier articles for Outside Magazine
 Ian Frazier articles at Byliner
 Ian Frazier on NPR for Travels in SIberia
 Ian Frazier at FSG
Profile at The Whiting Foundation
 
 Interview with Ian Frazier on WFMU's "The Speakeasy with Dorian" (RealAudio)
 Review of Gone to New York
 Select the RealAudio link by "LAMENTATIONS OF A FATHER" at time 28:42 to hear Ian Frazier read his "Laws Concerning Food and Drink; Household Principles; Lamentations of the Father" on the January 24, 1998 Prairie Home Companion broadcast.
 The famous mock-legal complaint Coyote v. Acme, to which a lawyer made this reply
 Lambert, Craig (September–October 2008). "Seriously Funny: Ian Frazier combines an historian's discipline with an original comic mind". Harvard Magazine.

1951 births
Living people
The Harvard Lampoon alumni
People from Hudson, Ohio
The New Yorker people
The New Yorker staff writers
Writers from Ohio
American humorists
20th-century American non-fiction writers
21st-century American non-fiction writers
Journalists from Ohio
20th-century American male writers
American male non-fiction writers
Western Reserve Academy alumni
21st-century American male writers
Members of the American Academy of Arts and Letters